The following is a list of the buildings on the campus of Saint Joseph's University, Hawk Hill, located in Philadelphia, Pennsylvania, United States.

Academic buildings

Barbelin Hall, College of Arts & Sciences building; named in honor of Rev. Felix-Joseph Barbelin, S.J., first president of SJU
Bellarmine Hall, foreign Language and Arts & Sciences building named in honor of Saint Robert Bellarmine S.J.
Connelly Hall, math and science building named for the area of Lower Merion it is located in
ELS Building, home of offices for international students
Francis A. Drexel Library, named in honor of benefactor Francis Drexel
Mandeville Hall, home of the Haub School of Business, named in honor of businessman Owen A. Mandeville
Merion Hall, named for its location in Lower Merion Township; academic building; home of the English department
Post Hall, sociology, psychology, and fine arts building named in honor of benefactor and alum John R. Post
Post Learning Commons, structurally joined to Drexel Library
ROTC Building, home to the Air Force ROTC
Science Center

Administrative buildings
Bronstein Hall, home of the communications department
Claver House, named in honor of Saint Peter Claver, home of the honors department
Human Resources and University Communications, home of the human resources office
Loyola Center, named in honor of Ignatius of Loyola, home of the Jesuits
Regis Hall, President's Office, named in honor of Saint John Francis Regis
Saint Thomas Hall, named in honor of Saint Thomas Aquinas, home of the financial aid office
University Press, home of the Saint Joseph's University Press

Arts and entertainment buildings
Bluett Theater, home of the Cap and Bells Dramatic Arts Society located in Post Hall
Boland Hall, home of the University Gallery
Fine Arts East, home of art classrooms and offices
Fine Arts West, home of art classrooms and offices

Athletic buildings
Hagan Arena, home of the Saint Joseph's Hawks
O'Pake Recreation Center, home of intramural sports; located on the Maguire Campus; named in honor of Pennsylvania State Senator and alumnus Michael A. O'Pake '61
Ramsay Basketball Center, home of offices and the men's and women's basketball teams
Robert Gillin, Jr. Boathouse, home of the rowing teams, located on Boathouse Row
Sports Complex, located next to the Fieldhouse; home of varsity sports

Ministry buildings
Chapel of Saint Joseph-Michael J. Smith S.J. Memorial, named in honor of the patron saint of the University and beloved professor and university member, respectively
Wolfington Hall, named in honor of alum and benefactor Eustace Wolfington's mother; center for campus ministry

Residence halls
LaFarge Hall, named in honor of Rev. John LaFarge S.J. an advocate for racial equality; a six-story, co-ed hall built in 1970 which accommodates 350 students
Moore Hall, named in honor of Rev. James W. Moore, S.J., longtime Associate Dean of the College of Arts and Sciences; a three-story, co-ed hall built in 1989 which accommodates 78 students; originally used by the Salvation Army
Sourin Hall, named in honor of Rev. Edward Sourin, S.J., an early Philadelphia Jesuit, who fought to establish Catholic education in a time when Catholicism found little acceptance; a four-story, co-ed hall built in 1980 which accommodates 225 students; the Student Health Center is located on the ground floor
McShain Hall, named in honor of John McShain, an alumnus who built Barbelin Hall as well as numerous buildings in Washington D.C.; a five-story, co-ed hall built in 1988 which accommodates 280 students; the City Avenue bridge connects the Lower Merion (and McShain) side of campus to the city side
Villiger Hall, named in honor of Fr. Burchard Villiger S.J., who was on the faculty of Saint Joseph's from its founding in 1851 and fifth president of Saint Joseph's College; a 413-bed residence center located on the corner of City and Cardinal Avenues; completed in August 2012

Campus houses
Hogan, acquired in 1964; accommodates 28 students
Jordan, acquired in 1959; accommodates 30 students
Quirk, acquired in 1948; accommodates 30 students
Saint Albert's, named in honor of Saint Albert of Louvain; acquired in 1959; accommodates 21 students
Saint Mary's, named in honor of the Blessed Mother; located on the Merion side of campus; accommodates 40 students
Simpson, located on central campus; accommodates 24 students
Sullivan, acquired in 1958; accommodates 27 students
Tara, named for the seat of the ancient Irish Kings; acquired in 1949; accommodates 30 students
Xavier, named in honor of Saint Francis Xavier S.J.; acquired in 1960; accommodates 24 students

University apartments and townhouses
Ashwood, co-ed apartment; located on Overbrook Avenue; has a capacity for 170 students
Lannon, named in honor of former president Rev. Timothy R. Lannon, S.J.; located next to Rashford; complex which houses 254 students)
Merion Gardens, apartment complex on City Avenue on the Merion side; 216 students reside here
Morris Quad Townhouses, opened in the fall of 1997; townhouses which accompany 116 students
Pennbrook, located on 63rd and City Avenue across the street from Overbrook Station
Rashford, named in honor of former president Rev. Nicholas Rashford, S.J.; located on City Avenue; apartment complex which houses 152 students

Student life buildings
Campion Student Center, named in honor of Saint Edmund Campion S.J.
Campus Commons, located on the Maguire Campus; converted chapel; serves as an area for students to relax or study
Hawks' Landing, home of the bookstore, Starbucks, and a six-story parking garage
Paris Auditorium/Dining Hall, located on Maguire Campus; Black Box Theatre & Campus Dining Hall
The Perch, has a lounge, games, pool tables, televisions, and a stage for students

External links
Saint Joseph's University
Saint Joseph's University campus map

References

Saint Joseph's University
Saint Joseph's University
Saint Joseph's University